Jean-Pierre Chevènement (born 9 March 1939) is a French politician who served as a minister in the 1980s and 1990s best known for his candidacy in the 2002 French presidential election. After serving as mayor of Belfort, he was elected to the Senate for the Territoire de Belfort in 2008. As a cofounder of the PS and founder of the Republican and Citizen Movement (MRC), he is a significant figure of the French left.

Biography

Background 
The Chevènement family is of Swiss origin, with their original name, Schwennemann, having been gallicized to Chevènement in the 18th century. He was born in Belfort near the Swiss border, speaks German, and studied in Vienna.

Beginning in politics  
Chevènement's idiosyncratic left-wing nationalism has led to comparison with the late British politician Peter Shore. He describes his Eurosceptic and Gaullist position as "republican". He was Mayor of Belfort from 1983 to 2008 and was a Deputy in the National Assembly from 1973 to 2002.

He joined the French Section of the Workers' International (SFIO) and founded the Center for Socialist Studies, Research and Education (Centre d'études, de recherche et d'éducation socialistes or CERES). The organization constituted the left wing of the party, and promoted an alliance with the French Communist Party.

In 1969 the SFIO was superseded by the Socialist Party (Parti socialiste or PS). Two years later, CERES supported the takeover of the party by François Mitterrand. It played a major role in drawing up the Socialist plan for victory in the 1981 elections.

In governments 
Chevènement was Minister of Research and Industry from 1981 to 1983, when he resigned, for the first of three times in his career. He disagreed with the change in economic policy made by President Mitterrand in order to stay in the European Monetary System. He has said that "a minister has to keep his mouth shut; if he wants to open it, he resigns". However, he returned to the cabinet as Minister of National Education from 1984 to 1986.

Appointed Minister of Defence in 1988, he served until 1991, when he resigned due to his opposition to the Gulf War. After this he opposed the Maastricht Treaty, an issue on which Mitterrand and the PS led the "yes" campaign. In 1993 he left the PS and founded a new political party: the Citizens' Movement (Mouvement des citoyens or MDC).

Chevènement and the MDC participated in the formation of the Plural Left coalition. When it won the 1997 legislative election he became Minister of the Interior in the government of Lionel Jospin. On 2 September 1998, Chevènement underwent surgery on his gall bladder. He then had a severe allergic reaction to the anesthetic, causing him to lapse into a coma for 8 days. He began to recover, leaving the hospital on 22 October, but he could not work in his ministry for another four months. As a result of this episode he gained the nickname "the miracle of the republic".

For the third time, Chevènement resigned from the government in 2000 because of his opposition to giving increased autonomy to Corsica and in order to prepare his candidacy to the 2002 presidential elections.

2002 presidential election  
He was a candidate at the 2002 presidential election. He put himself forward as the leader of the "republicans" against what he called the "Chirac/Jospin duo". He created the Republican Pole, for more left-wing nationalists. He won 5% of the vote. Many Socialists blamed Chevènement for the elimination of Lionel Jospin in the first round of the presidential race. Consequently, at the June 2002 legislative election, the PS invested a candidate against him in the Belfort constituency. In this, he was defeated by the Union for a Popular Movement (UMP) candidate and lost his parliamentary seat.

Citizen and Republican Movement 
Finally, the Republican Pole split and Chevènement created the Citizen and Republican Movement (Mouvement républicain et citoyen or MRC), which described itself as a left-wing party. He reconciled with the PS when, after raising the possibility of a new presidential candidacy, he renounced this to support Ségolène Royal's candidacy in the 2007 presidential election. In spite of the PS support, he failed to retake his parliamentary seat at the 2007 legislative election. He announced that he would not stand as a candidate for another term as Mayor of Belfort.

In 2004 he established the Foundation "Res Publica", which aims to promote the 'republican model' (le modèle républicain) and to define a long-term political vision. Chevènement states, however, that Res Publica is not a political party.

In the Senate election held on 21 September 2008, Chevènement was elected as a Senator from the Territory of Belfort, defeating his opponent, Socialist candidate Yves Ackerman. In June 2014, he announced that he will not stand at the 2014 Senate election.

He tried to be candidate for the presidential election of 2012.

Political profile 
Jean-Pierre Chevènement is a souverainist and patriotic left-wing politician, a kind of left-wing gaullist. In consequences, he is opposed to European federalism because of a possible disappearance of nations and the creation of a non-democratic construction led by non-elected technocrats. He calls for a transformation of the single currency (Euro) into a common currency, allowing countries to adapt and control their economies, but also allowing EU to have a single voice in the world. Indeed, he has criticized the bad influence of a strong currency on other countries of Europe such as Greece, Italy, Spain and Portugal.

In office he defended the "French status" in NATO: i.e. outside the integrated military command. He opposed rejoining it in 2009.

He defends a strict separation of church and state in addition to his vision of a harmonious nation-state, being against communitarianism and for cultural assimilation.

Political career
Governmental functions

 Minister of State Minister of Research and Technology : 1981–1982
 Minister of State, Minister of Industry Research : 1982–1983
 Minister of National Education : 1984–1986
 Minister of Defense : 1988–1991
 Minister of Interior : 1997–2000

Electoral mandates

National Assembly of France

Member of the National Assembly of France for Territoire de Belfort (1st then 2nd constituency from 1988 to 2002) : 1973–1981 (Became minister in 1981) / 1986–1988 (Became minister in 1988) / 1991–1997 (Became minister in 1997) / 2000–2002. Elected in 1973, reelected in 1978, 1981, 1986, 1988, 1991, 1993, 1997, 2000.

Senate of France

Senator of Territoire de Belfort : Since 2008.

Regional Council

President of the Regional Council of Franche-Comté : 1981–1982.

Regional councillor of Franche-Comté : 1974–1988 (Resignation). Elected in 1986.

Municipal Council

Mayor of Belfort : 1983–1997 (Resignation) / 2001–2007 (Resignation). Reelected in 1989, 1995, 2001.

1st deputy-mayor of Belfort : 1977–1983 / 1997–2001. Reelected in 1997.

Municipal councillor of Belfort : 1977–2008. Reelected in 1983, 1989, 1995, 2001.

Agglomeration community Council

President of the Agglomeration community of Belfort : 1977–2008. Reelected in 1983, 1989, 1995, 2001.

Member of the Agglomeration community of Belfort : 1977–2008. Reelected in 1983, 1989, 1995, 2001.

Political functions

President of the Citizen and Republican Movement : Since 2008.

References

1939 births
Living people
Politicians from Belfort
French people of Swiss descent
French Section of the Workers' International politicians
Socialist Party (France) politicians
Citizen and Republican Movement politicians
French Ministers of National Education
French Ministers of Defence
French interior ministers
Deputies of the 5th National Assembly of the French Fifth Republic
Deputies of the 6th National Assembly of the French Fifth Republic
Deputies of the 7th National Assembly of the French Fifth Republic
Deputies of the 8th National Assembly of the French Fifth Republic
Deputies of the 9th National Assembly of the French Fifth Republic
Deputies of the 10th National Assembly of the French Fifth Republic
Deputies of the 11th National Assembly of the French Fifth Republic
French Senators of the Fifth Republic
Senators of Territoire de Belfort
Mayors of places in Bourgogne-Franche-Comté
Candidates in the 2002 French presidential election
Sciences Po alumni
École nationale d'administration alumni